Arsène Lupin versus Herlock Sholmès is the second collection of Arsène Lupin stories written by Maurice Leblanc, featuring two adventures following a match of wits between Lupin and Herlock Sholmès. The character "Herlock Sholmès" is a transparent reference to Sherlock Holmes of Arthur Conan Doyle's detective stories, who appeared in "Sherlock Holmes Arrives Too Late", one of the eight stories in the first collection, Arsène Lupin, Gentleman Burglar. The collection was translated twice into English, as Arsène Lupin versus Herlock Sholmès in the US (1910, by George Morehead), and as Arsène Lupin versus Holmlock Shears in the UK (1910, by Alexander Teixeira de Mattos, printed as The Blonde Lady in the US).

Publication history
The two stories were initially published in the magazine Je sais tout from November 1906. The first story, The Blonde Lady, was published from November 1906 to April 1907, while the second, The Jewish Lamp, appeared in September and October 1907. The collection of these two stories was published with modifications in February 1908, and in 1914, another edition appeared with further modifications. The English translations appeared in 1910.

Contents
The two English collections contain the following chapters or stories:

 Arsène Lupin versus Herlock Sholmès (2 stories)
1) "The Blond Lady" (novel)
 Lottery Ticket No. 514 
 The Blue Diamond 
 Herlock Sholmès Opens Hostilities 
 Light in the Darkness 
 An Abduction 
 Second Arrest of Arsène Lupin 
2) "The Jewish Lamp" (tale) 
 The Shipwreck

 Arsène Lupin versus Holmlock Shears, aka The Blonde Lady (2 stories)
 "The Blonde Lady", comprising six chapters
 Number 514, Series 23
 The Blue Diamond
 Holmlock Shears Opens Hostilities
 A Glimmer in the Darkness
 Kidnapped
 The Second Arrest of Arsène Lupin
 "The Jewish Lamp", comprising two chapters
 Chapter I
 Chapter II

Summary
The first story, "The Blonde Lady", opens with the purchase of an antique desk by a mathematics professor. The desk is subsequently stolen, as it turns out, by Arsène Lupin. Later, both Lupin and the professor realize that a lottery ticket, left inadvertently in the desk, is the winning ticket, and Lupin proceeds to ensure he obtains half of the winnings while executing a near-impossible escape with a blonde lady. After the theft of the Blue Diamond, again by a blonde lady, Ganimard made the connection to Lupin and an appeal was made to Herlock Sholmès to match wits with Lupin. Inadvertently, Lupin and his biographer met with the newly arrived Sholmès and his assistant, Wilson, in a Parisian restaurant, and they shared a cautious détente before Lupin sets off to lay his traps. Despite Lupin's efforts, Sholmès is able to unveil the identity of the blonde lady and Lupin's involvement in the crimes linked to her. Lupin succeeds in trapping Sholmès, however, and sends him off to Southampton in a boat, but Sholmès manages to escape back to Paris and engineer the arrest of Lupin. After Sholmès leaves, however, Lupin outfoxes his French captors and manages to bid farewell to Sholmès and Wilson at the Gare du Nord.

"The Jewish Lamp" opens with another appeal to Herlock Sholmès for help in recovering a Jewish lamp. After reading the appeal, Sholmès is shocked to read a second letter, this time by Lupin and arriving on the same day's post, which warns him not to intervene. Sholmès is outraged by Lupin's audacity and resolves to go to Paris. At the Gare du Nord, Sholmès is accosted by a young lady, who again warns him not to intervene, and finds that the Echo de France, Lupin's mouthpiece newspaper, is proclaiming his arrival. Sholmès proceeds to investigate the crime and finds out the true reason for Lupin's appeal not to intervene.

Film adaptation
A 1910 film serial entitled Arsène Lupin contra Sherlock Holmes adapted Leblanc's stories. German copyright laws allowed the producers to return "Sholmès" to the proper "Sherlock Holmes" who was portrayed by Viggo Larsen.

See also
 Pop culture references to Sherlock Holmes
 Herlock Sholmes (Ace Attorney)

References

External links
English translations

 
 
 (tr. 1910 by George Morehead, Chicago: Donohue)
 (tr. 1910 by Alexander Teixeira de Mattos, New York: Doubleday)

Original French text
  Arsène Lupin vs. Herlock Sholmès available on French Wikisource

Arsène Lupin novels
1908 French novels
Crossover novels
Works originally published in Je sais tout
Sherlock Holmes pastiches